The International Network in Biolinguistics  is an international network to do research on the biological basis of the language faculty, linking theoretical linguistics, developmental psychology, theoretical biology, evolutionary biology and psychology, molecular biology, genetics, and physics. It has members from varieties of discipline across the globe.

Members  
Michael A. Arbib, 
Evan Balaban, 
Robert Berwick, 
Thomas G. Bever, 
Cedric Boeckx, 
Johan J. Bolhuis, 
Lisa Cheng, 
Noam Chomsky, 
Anna Maria Di Sciullo, 
Ansgar Endress, 
Simon E. Fisher, 
W. Tecumseh Fitch, 
Angela D. Friederici, 
Roland Friedrich, 
Koji Fujita, 
Alessandra Giorgi, 
Kleanthes K. Grohmann, 
Mohamed Guerssel, 
Heidi Harley, 
Marc Hauser, 
Lyle Jenkins, 
Richard S. Kayne, 
Peter Kosta, 
Marie Labelle, 
Richard Larson, 
Howard Lasnik, 
Giuseppe Longobardi, 
John S. Lumsden, 
Jing Luo, 
James McGilvray, 
Ningombam Bupenda Meitei, 
Partha Mitra, 
Andrea Moro, 
Massimo Piattelli-Palmarini, 
David Poeppel, 
Luigi Rizzi, 
Kenneth Safir, 
Uli Sauerland, 
Fuzhen Si, 
Karin Stromswold, 
Juan Uriagereka, 
Elly Van Gelderen, 
Andrew Wedel, 
Kenneth Wexler, 
Charles Yang.

Conferences

2013
Sur la complexité des langues humaines, UQAM, February 8, 2013
This miniworkshop on language complexity is in French.

2011
New Perspectives on Language Creativity: Composition and Recursion, UQAM, September 25–27, 2011

2010
The Language Design, UQAM, May 27–30, 2010

2008
First Meeting of the INB, Tucson, Arizona, February 23–24, 2008.

2007
Biolinguistic Investigations, Santo Domingo, 2007

Biolinguistics: Language Evolution and Variation, Venice, 2007.

Papers
The list of papers  is the production from different contributors and subject experts of the world.

Notes

References
International Network in Biolinguistics
Members
2013 conference in French
2011 conference
2010 conference
2008 Arizona conference
2007 Santo Domingo conference
2007 Venice conference
Papers

External links
 Official site of International Network in Biolinguistics

Linguistics organizations
International scientific organizations
Philosophers of science
Philosophers of language